The 1964–65 FA Cup was the 84th staging of the world's oldest football cup competition, the Football Association Challenge Cup, commonly known as the FA Cup. Liverpool won the competition for the first time (despite having reached two finals previously), beating Leeds United 2–1 after extra time in the final at Wembley.

Matches were scheduled to be played at the stadium of the team named first on the date specified for each round, which was always a Saturday. Some matches, however, might be rescheduled for other days if there were clashes with games for other competitions or the weather was inclement. If scores were level after 90 minutes had been played, a replay would take place at the stadium of the second-named team later the same week. If the replayed match was drawn further replays would be held until a winner was determined. If scores were level after 90 minutes had been played in a replay, a 30-minute period of extra time would be played.

Calendar

Results

First round proper

At this stage clubs from the Football League Third and Fourth Divisions joined 30 non-league clubs having come through the qualifying rounds. To complete this round Crook Town and Enfield given byes. Matches were scheduled to be played on Saturday, 14 November 1964. Eight were drawn and went to replays three or four days later. Two of these replayed matches required a second replay to complete the fixture, with those games played the following week.

Second round 
The matches were scheduled for Saturday, 5 December 1964. Five matches were drawn, with replays taking place later the same week. The Stockport County–Grimsby Town game was played midweek on the 7 December, however.

Third round 
The 44 First and Second Division clubs entered the competition at this stage. The matches were scheduled for Saturday, 9 January 1965. Ten matches were drawn and went to replays, though none of these then resulted in a second replay.

Fourth round 
The matches were scheduled for Saturday, 30 January 1965. Six matches were drawn and went to replays. The replays were all played two, three or four days later.

Fifth round 
The matches were scheduled for Saturday, 20 February 1965. Two games required replays during the midweek fixture, and the Aston Villa&Wolverhampton Wanderers match went to a third game the following week, with Wolves the victors.

Sixth round

The four quarter-final ties were scheduled to be played on Saturday, 6 March 1965. Two of these matches, however, were not played until Wednesday, 10 March. In addition, the Leicester City–Liverpool match went to a replay on this date.

Semi-finals

The semi-final matches were played on Saturday, 27 March 1965. Leeds United and Liverpool came through the semi final round to meet at Wembley.

Replay

Final

The 1965 FA Cup final was contested by Liverpool and Leeds United at Wembley on Saturday 1 May 1965. The match finished 2–1 to Liverpool, with all three goals coming in extra time.

References
General
The FA Cup Archive at TheFA.com
English FA Cup 1964/65 at Soccerbase
F.A. Cup results 1964/65 at Footballsite
Specific

 
FA Cup seasons
Fa
Eng